Eitenia is a genus of Brazilian flowering plants in the family Asteraceae.

 Species
 Eitenia polyseta R.M.King & H.Rob. - Brazil (Goiás, Distrito Federal)
 Eitenia praxeloides R.M.King & H.Rob. - Brazil (Goiás)

References

Asteraceae genera
Eupatorieae
Endemic flora of Brazil